Normal form may refer to:

Normal form (databases)
Normal form (game theory)
Canonical form
Normal form (dynamical systems)
Hesse normal form
Normal form in music
Jordan normal form

in formal language theory:
Chomsky normal form
Greibach normal form
Kuroda normal form
Normal form (abstract rewriting), an element of a rewrite system which cannot be further rewritten

in logic:
Normal form (natural deduction)
Algebraic normal form
Canonical normal form
Clausal normal form
Conjunctive normal form
Disjunctive normal form
Negation normal form
Prenex normal form
Skolem normal form

in lambda calculus:
Beta normal form

See also
Normalization (disambiguation)
Normalization property